Max Houkes (born 3 July 2000) is a Dutch tennis player.

Houkes has a career high ATP singles ranking of 339 achieved on 21 November 2022. He also has a career high doubles ranking of 520 achieved on 31 October 2022.

Houkes has won 1 ATP Challenger doubles title at the 2022 Lima Challenger II with Jesper de Jong.

ATP Challenger and ITF World Tennis Tour finals

Singles: 6 (4–2)

Doubles 11 (8–3)

References

External links
 
 

2000 births
Living people
Dutch male tennis players
Sportspeople from Emmen, Netherlands
21st-century Dutch people